Empenthrin (also called vaporthrin) is a synthetic pyrethroid used in insecticides. It is active against broad spectrum of flying insects including moths and other pests damaging textile. It has low acute mammalian toxicity (its oral LD50 is above 5000 mg/kg in male rats, above 3500 mg/kg in female rats and greater than 3500 mg/kg in mice). It is however very toxic to fish and other aquatic organisms (96-hour LC50 in Oncorhynchus mykiss is 1.7 μg/L, 48-hour EC50 in Daphnia magna is 20 μg/L).

References

Chrysanthemate esters
Ethynyl compounds